Abdulrahman Mussa is a Kuwaiti football midfielder who played for Kuwait in the 2004 AFC Asian Cup.

References 

Living people
Kuwaiti footballers
Kuwait international footballers
Association football midfielders
1981 births
Kuwait Premier League players
Al-Nasr SC (Kuwait) players
Al Salmiya SC players
Qadsia SC players